Muro de Alcoy or Muro d'Alcoi, also briefly called Muro is a town and municipality located in the comarca of Comtat, in the province of Alicante, Spain, lying at the foot of the Serra de Mariola. As of 2009, it has a total population of c. 8,900 inhabitants. The economy of Muro de Alcoy is based on textile industry, manufacture of plastic products and furniture and agriculture (olives and almonds).

The main festival in Muro is the Moros i cristians, celebrated during the second weekend of May. According to popular tradition the festival commemorate the battles, combats and fights between Moors (or Muslims) and Christians during the period known as Reconquista (from the 8th century through the 15th century). The festivals represent the capture of the city by the Moors and the subsequent Christian reconquest.

Notable people 
 

 Àlex Pascual (born 1977), footballer

See also 
 Serra Mariola Natural Park

References

External links 
Pictures of Moros y Cristianos, Muro 2006

Municipalities in the Province of Alicante